Everything You Want is the third studio album by Vertical Horizon and its first major label effort. Released in 1999, it was a breakthrough album for the band. Four singles were released from the album. The second single, "Everything You Want", became one of the most played singles of 2000, reaching number one on the Billboard Hot 100. In 2001, the album was certified double platinum by the RIAA, having sold two million copies in the United States.

Background
In the late 1990s, Vertical Horizon's indie albums began to attract record executives from several record labels. The band signed with RCA Records in 1998.

Release and commercial success
The album was released on June 15, 1999. The album's first single was "We Are", which managed to reach the Modern Rock Tracks chart and peaked at no. 21. The album's second single was "Everything You Want". The song became a massive hit, reaching number one at the Billboard Hot 100 chart and the Adult Top 40 chart and becoming Billboard's Most Played Single of 2000. As of 2019, "Everything You Want" is Vertical Horizon's most successful single. Two other singles from the album, "You're a God" and "Best I Ever Had (Grey Sky Morning)", were also hits; they peaked at 23 and 58, respectively, at the Billboard Hot 100 chart.

The album peaked at number 40 at the Billboard 200 albums chart and number three at the Billboard top heatseekers chart.

Track listing
All songs written by Matt Scannell, except "Shackled" by Keith Kane.

 "We Are" – 4:00
 "You're a God" – 3:38
 "Everything You Want" – 4:17
 "Best I Ever Had (Grey Sky Morning)" – 4:30
 "You Say" – 3:58
 "Finding Me" – 4:32
 "Miracle" – 4:22
 "Send It Up" – 3:42
 "Give You Back" – 4:22
 "All of You" – 3:04
 "Shackled" – 5:19

Personnel
Vertical Horizon
 Matt Scannell – lead vocals , backing vocals, electric and acoustic guitars, keyboards, producer 
 Keith Kane – lead vocals , backing vocals, acoustic guitars
 Sean Hurley – bass guitar
 Ed Toth – drums, percussion

Additional personnel
 Mark Endert – producer , additional production , mixing , additional engineering, programming, editing, keyboards
 Ben Grosse – producer , mixing , engineering, programming, editing
 David Bendeth – producer 
 Tom Lord-Alge – mixing 
 Scott Gormley, Alan Mason, Jenny Knotts, Dan Jurow, John Siket, Mike Tocci, Glen Tavachow – recording assistants
 Michael Tuller – programming, editing
 Mark Dufour – programming, editing, drum technician
 Luis Resto – keyboards
 Jamie Muhoberac – keyboards
 Chris Sobchack – drum technician
 Ted Jensen – mastering
 Paul Angelli – mastering assistant
 John Heiden – art direction, art design
 Bunny Yeager – cover photograph
 Danny Clinch – band photographs

Charts

Weekly charts

Year-end charts

Certifications

References

Vertical Horizon albums
1999 albums
RCA Records albums